China Merchants Tower is a skyscraper in Shekou, Nanshan District, Shenzhen, China. It was designed by Skidmore, Owings, & Merrill.

Design
The building is designed to allow access to outdoor balconies on every level.

Awards
Architizer A+ Award: Office Building High Rise (2015)
Award of Merit: Architectural Engineering Integration (2015)

Gallery

See also
List of tallest buildings in Shenzhen

References

Skidmore, Owings & Merrill buildings
Office buildings completed in 2013
Skyscraper office buildings in Shenzhen
Nanshan District, Shenzhen
Retail buildings in China
Skyscrapers in Shenzhen